Gerald Online was an online jewellery retail store run in collaboration with Gerald Ratner and a Mumbai-based jewellery export company, SB&T International Ltd. Ratner partnered with an Indian jewellery manufacturer to import their jewellery into the UK.

History
In 1984, founder Gerald Ratner inherited his family business, Ratners. About 10 years later, Ratners was one of the biggest jewellers in the world. However, due to several ill-advised jokes from Ratner during his 1991 speech to the Institute of Directors at the Royal Albert Hall, Ratners went into bankruptcy.

In 2003, after re-establishing Ratners under the new name of Signet Jewelers, Gerald Ratner founded online business Gerald Online in collaboration with SB&T, a Mumbai-based jewellery Export Company.

Gerald Online ceased trading in approximately 2014.

Operations
Gerald Online presented itself as selling jewellery directly from its factory, claiming that this resulted in lower prices.

Gerald Ratner and SB&T entered the Indian market under the name Gerald Online India.

References

External links
All appear to be dead:
Geraldonline.com:  Gerald Online jewellery
Geraldonline.in: Gerald Online India jewellery
Geraldratner.co.uk: Gerald Ratner biography

Online jewellery retailers of the United Kingdom
Jewellery retailers of India
Retail companies based in London
Retail companies established in 2003
2003 establishments in England